Precipitable water  is the depth of water in a column of the atmosphere, if all the water in that column were precipitated as rain. As a depth, the precipitable water is measured in millimeters or inches.  Often abbreviated as "TPW", for Total Precipitable Water.

Measurement 
There are different measurement techniques: 
One type of measurement is based on the measurement of the solar irradiance on two wavelengths, one in a water absorption band, and the other not. The precipitable water column is determined using the irradiances in these bands and the Beer–Lambert law.
The precipitable water can also be calculated by integration of radiosonde data (relative humidity, pressure and temperature) over the whole atmosphere.
Data can be viewed on a Lifted-K index. The numbers represent inches of water as mentioned above for a geographical location.
Recently, methods using the Global Positioning System have been developed.
Some work has been performed to create empirical relationships between surface specific humidity and precipitable water based on localized measurements (generally a 2nd to 5th order polynomial).  However, this method has not received widespread use in part because humidity is a local measurement and precipitable water is a total column measurement.

External links 
Current global map of precipitable water

Remote Sensing of Water Vapor From GPS Receivers

References 

Water
Atmospheric thermodynamics